Daniel Drew was a 19th-century American financier.

Daniel Drew may also refer to:

Dan Drew (politician) (born 1979), American politician, mayor of Middletown, Connecticut 2011–2019
Dan Drew (1878–1923), Irish hurler
Danny Drew, see 2006 League of Ireland
Daniel Drew (rugby union) (1850–1914), Scottish rugby player
Daniel Drew (cricketer) (born 1996), Australian cricketer

See also